is a passenger railway station located in the city of Yokosuka, Kanagawa Prefecture, Japan, operated by the private railway company Keikyū.

Lines
Shin-ōtsu  Station is served by the Keikyū Kurihama Line and is located 0.8 rail kilometers from the junction at Horinouchi Station, and 53.1 km from the starting point of the Keikyū Main Line at Shinagawa Station in Tokyo.

Station layout
The station consists of two opposed side platforms connected to the station building by a footbridge.

Platforms

History
It was renamed Shin-ōtsu on February 1, 1948.

Passenger statistics
In fiscal 2019, the station was used by an average of 6,797 passengers daily. 

The passenger figures for previous years are as shown below.

Surrounding area
 Kanagawa Prefectural Yokosuka Otsu High School
 Yokosuka City Otsu Junior High School
 Yokosuka City Otsu Elementary School
 Yokosuka City Negishi Elementary School

See also
 List of railway stations in Japan

References

External links

 

Keikyū Kurihama Line
Railway stations in Kanagawa Prefecture
Railway stations in Japan opened in 1942
Railway stations in Yokosuka, Kanagawa